How Can We Be Silent is the third studio album from contemporary Christian band BarlowGirl. It was released on July 24, 2007, in five different editions, including three retailer-exclusive editions that each added a unique acoustic bonus track.

Similarly to Another Journal Entry, this album was released in a special edition variant known as How Can We Be Silent Premium Edition. It was released concurrently with the regular edition, adding a new cover sleeve and bundling a 45-minute DVD. Video content includes personal interviews, stories behind the songs on the album and two previously released music videos, "I Need You to Love Me and "Never Alone".

Marketing

On May 20, 2007, Warner Music Group launched a promotional site, Have You Heard The Word?, to promote this album and other upcoming releases.

Two music videos were announced, but cancelled, during the How Can We Be Silent era. The first was announced on May 24, 2007, on the How Can We Be Silent All Access Pass site intended for Family Christian Stores customers, without announcing the song for the music video. Additionally, the back of the All Access Pass mentions "the world premiere of the new BarlowGirl video and more!" However, no such premiere occurred and the music video release was ultimately cancelled. The second music video, "Sweet Revenge", was recorded in 2009 by 1834 Productions as part of a Deep Forgiveness devotional. A promotional video features a very short clip of Alyssa Barlow in the music video. However, the song cannot be heard, as the audio uses a promotional narrator. This music video is lost, as it was omitted from Deep Forgiveness.

Critical reception

How Can We Be Silent received generally positive reviews. Stephen Thomas Erlewine from Allmusic was less impressed, giving the album 2½ out of 5 stars for its "gothic textures" and its "noisy, cluttered multi-segmented songs." Similarly, David Sessions from Patrol Magazine gave the album a 4.7 out of 10 rating, calling it "an unvaried ruckus sustained for 50 minutes". The album's sound was likened to that of Evanescence.

Track listing
Alyssa Barlow and Lauren Barlow share lead vocals in the band. The main lead singer of each song is noted below:

Personnel 
Credits for How Can We Be Silent adapted from liner notes.

Musicians

 Alyssa Barlow, Lauren Barlow, Rebecca Barlow – vocals
 Alyssa Barlow – bass and keyboards
 Lauren Barlow – drums
 Rebecca Barlow – guitars
 Sabrina Barlow – background vocals ("Million Voices")
 Rob Hawkins – acoustic and electric guitars
 John Painter – horns and woodwinds
 New Song Ensemble – choir ("Million Voices")

Musicians (New Song Ensemble)

 Julie Carter – soprano
 Janine Jones – soprano
 Liz George – soprano
 Amy Miller – soprano
 Sarah Tweet – alto
 Marisha Wagner – alto
 Cindy Wagner – alto
 Adam Bastien – tenor
 Brian Robison – tenor
 Todd Fertig – tenor
 Kyle Cooper – tenor
 Matthew Seckman – tenor
 Dustin Whitney – tenor

Musicians (Lovesponge Quartet)

 David Davidson, David Angell – violin
 Kristin Wilkinson – viola
 John Catchings – cello
 Trish Price – melotron ("One More Round")
 Otto Price – programming, guitars, jazz drums, accordion, synthesizer and miscellanea

Production

 Otto Price – executive producer, producer, programming, additional programming, A&R direction, engineer, vocal arrangements
 Susan Riley – executive producer, A&R direction
 Cindy Wagner – director, New Song Ensemble
 George Cocchini – tone control
 David Das – programming, string arrangements
 Tony High – engineer
 Bryan Lenox – engineer, mixer
 Katherine Petillo – creative director
 Jeremy Cowart – photography
 Sarah Barlow – additional photography
 Megan Thompson – make-up
 Neil Robinson – hairstylist
 Joseph Cassell – wardrobe
 Alexis Goodman  – design

Charts 
How Can We Be Silent debuted at No. 40 on the U.S. Billboard 200 chart, and No. 1 on the Billboard's Top Christian Albums chart, and sold about 25,000 copies in its first two weeks.

Singles from this album performed poorly on radio compared to other BarlowGirl albums. The first, "Here's My Life", was released in June 2007. It peaked at No. 12 on R&R's Christian contemporary hit radio charts and at No. 29 on Billboard's Hot Christian Songs chart.  "Million Voices" and "I Believe In Love" were released later that year, with no chart history available.

Awards 
In 2008, the album was nominated for a Dove Award for Rock/Contemporary Album of the Year at the 39th GMA Dove Awards. The song "Million Voices" was also nominated for Rock Recorded Song of the Year.

References 

2007 albums
BarlowGirl albums